Robert Louis Fosse (June 23, 1927 – September 23, 1987) was an American actor, choreographer, dancer, and film and stage director. He directed and choreographed musical works on stage and screen, including the stage musicals The Pajama Game (1954), Damn Yankees (1955), How to Succeed in Business Without Really Trying (1961), Sweet Charity (1966), Pippin (1972), and Chicago (1975). He directed the films Sweet Charity (1969), Cabaret (1972), Lenny (1975), All That Jazz (1979), and Star 80 (1983).

Fosse's distinctive style of choreography included turned-in knees and "jazz hands". He is the only person ever to have won Oscar, Emmy, and Tony awards in the same year (1973). He was nominated for four Academy Awards, winning Best Director for Cabaret, and won the Palme D'Or in 1980 for All That Jazz. He won a record eight Tonys for his choreography, as well as one for direction for Pippin.

Early life 
Fosse was born in Chicago, Illinois, on June 23, 1927, to a Norwegian American father, Cyril Kingsley Fosse, a traveling salesman for The Hershey Company, and an Irish American mother, Sarah Alice "Sadie" ( Stanton) Fosse. He was the fifth of six children.

He was drawn to dance and took lessons. When he was 13 years old, Fosse performed professionally in Chicago with Charles Grass, as "The Riff Brothers". They toured vaudeville and movie houses in Chicago, as well as USO theaters and Eagles Clubs. Many of these performances included shows at burlesque clubs, such as the Silver Cloud and Cave of Winds. Fosse himself is quoted with saying "I was sixteen years old, and I played the whole burlesque wheel." However, many of the women and promoters did not care that Fosse was underage working in adult clubs or that he would be exposed to sexual harassment from the burlesque women. Much of the erotica he saw would inspire his future work. In 1943, at age 15. Fosse would come to choreograph his first dance number and earn his first full credit as a choreographer in a film, Hold Evry'thing! A Streamlined Extravaganza in Two Parts, which featured showgirls wearing strapless dresses and performing a fan dance, inspired by his time in burlesque houses.

After graduating from high school in 1945, Fosse was recruited into the United States Navy toward the end of World War II at Naval Station Great Lakes, where he was sent to be prepared for combat. Fosse petitioned his manager, Frederick Weaver, to advocate on his behalf to his superiors after his own failed attempts to be placed in the Special Services Entertainment Division. Fosse was soon placed in the variety show Tough Situation, which toured military and naval bases in the Pacific.

After his discharge, Fosse moved to New York City in 1947 with the ambition of being the new Fred Astaire. He began to study acting at the American Theatre Wing, where he met his first wife and dance partner, Mary Ann Niles (1923-1987). His first stage role was in Call Me Mister, along with Niles. Fosse and Niles were regular performers on Your Hit Parade in its 1950–1951 season. Dean Martin and Jerry Lewis saw their act in New York's Pierre Hotel and scheduled the couple to appear on The Colgate Comedy Hour in 1951.

In a 1986 interview Fosse told an interviewer, "Jerry started me doing choreography. He gave me my first job as a choreographer and I'm grateful for that."

Fosse was signed to an MGM contract in 1953. His early screen appearances as a dancer included Give a Girl a Break, The Affairs of Dobie Gillis and Kiss Me Kate, all released in 1953. Fosse's choreography of a short dance sequence in Kiss Me Kate and dance with Carol Haney brought him to the attention of Broadway producers.

Career

1940s 
During the late 1940s and early 1950s, Fosse transitioned from film to theatre. In 1948, Tony Charmoli danced in Make Mine Manhattan, but gave the part to Fosse when the show toured nationally. Charmoli also found Fosse work as a dancer on the TV shows he was working on when Fosse returned from the tour.

1950s 
In 1953, Fosse appeared in the M-G-M musical Kiss Me Kate, starring Howard Keel, Kathryn Grayson, and Ann Miller. Fosse played Hortensio within The Taming of the Shrew dance sequences.

In 1954, Fosse choreographed his first musical, The Pajama Game, followed by My Sister Eileen and George Abbott's Damn Yankees in 1955. It was while working on Damn Yankees that he first met rising star Gwen Verdon, whom he married in 1960. For her work in Damn Yankees, Verdon won her first Tony Award for Best Actress in a Musical in 1956. She had previously won a Tony for Best Performance by a Featured Actress in a Musical for Can-Can (1954). In 1957, Fosse choreographed New Girl in Town, also directed by Abbott, and Verdon won her second Tony Award for Best Actress in a Musical in 1958.

In 1957, Fosse choreographed the film version of The Pajama Game starring Doris Day. The next year, Fosse appeared in and choreographed the film version of Damn Yankees, in which Verdon reprised her stage triumph as the character Lola. Fosse and Verdon were partners in the mambo number "Who's Got the Pain".

In 1959, Fosse directed and choreographed the musical Redhead.

1960s 
For his work on Redhead, Fosse won the Tony Award for Best Choreography while Verdon won her third Tony Award for Best Actress in a Musical. Redhead won the Tony Award for best musical. Fosse's next feature was supposed to be the musical The Conquering Hero based on a book by Larry Gelbart, but he was replaced as director/choreographer.

In 1961, Fosse choreographed the satirical Broadway musical How to Succeed in Business Without Really Trying starring Robert Morse. The story revolves around an ambitious man, J. Pierrepont Finch (Morse), who, with the help of the book How to Succeed in Business Without Really Trying, rises from window washer to chairman of the board of the World Wide Wicket Company. The musical was an instant hit.

In 1963, Fosse was nominated for two Tony Awards for Best Choreography and Best Direction of a Musical for the musical Little Me, winning the former.

He choreographed and directed Verdon in Sweet Charity in 1966.

Fosse directed five feature films. His first, Sweet Charity (1969) starring Shirley MacLaine, is an adaptation of the Broadway musical he had directed and choreographed.

1970s 
In 1972, Fosse directed his second theatrical film, Cabaret, starring Liza Minnelli, Michael York and Joel Grey. The film is based on the 1966 musical of the same name. In the traditional manner of musical theater, called an "integrated musical", every significant character in the stage version sings to express his or her own emotion and to advance the plot. In the film version, the musical numbers are entirely diegetic. The film focuses on a young romance between Sally Bowles (Minnelli), who performs at the Kit Kat Klub, and a young British idealist played by York. The story set at the backdrop of the rise of Nazi Germany. The film was an immediate success among audiences and critics alike. The film won eight Academy Awards, including Best Director. Liza Minnelli and Joel Grey both won Oscars for their roles in Cabaret.

Also in 1972, Fosse and Minnelli joined once again to create her TV Special Liza with a Z, earning Fosse an Emmy Award for both direction and choreography.

In 1973, Fosse's work on Pippin won him the Tony Award for Best Direction of a Musical. He was director and choreographer of Chicago in 1975, which also starred Verdon.

In 1974, Fosse directed Lenny, a biographical movie about comedian Lenny Bruce starring Dustin Hoffman. Fosse was again nominated for Best Director, Hoffman also received a nomination for Best Actor.

Fosse performed a song and dance in Stanley Donen's 1974 film version of The Little Prince. According to AllMusic, "Bob Fosse stops the show with a slithery dance routine." In 1977, Fosse had a small role in the romantic comedy Thieves.

In 1979, Fosse co-wrote and directed a semi-autobiographical film All That Jazz (1979), starring Roy Scheider, which portrayed the life of a womanizing, drug-addicted choreographer and director in the midst of triumph and failure. Ann Reinking appears in the film as the protagonist's lover, protégée and domestic partner. All That Jazz won four Academy Awards, earning Fosse his third Oscar nomination for Best Director. It also won the Palme d'Or at the 1980 Cannes Film Festival. In 1980, Fosse commissioned documentary research for a follow-up feature exploring the motivations of people who become performers.

1980s 
Fosse's final film, Star 80 (1983), was a biographical movie about Dorothy Stratten, a Playboy Playmate who was murdered. The film is based on a Pulitzer Prize-winning article. The film was screened out of competition at the 34th Berlin International Film Festival.

In 1986, Fosse wrote, choreographed and directed the Broadway production of Big Deal, which was nominated for five Tony awards, winning for best choreography, as well as five more for the revival of Sweet Charity at the nearby Minskoff Theater, winning a Tony for Best Revival.

Fosse began work on a film about gossip columnist Walter Winchell that would have starred Robert De Niro as Winchell. The Winchell script was written by Michael Herr. Fosse died before starting the Winchell project.

Innovations 
Notable distinctions of Fosse's style included the use of turned-in knees, the "Fosse Amoeba", sideways shuffling, rolled shoulders and jazz hands. With Astaire as an influence, Fosse used props such as bowler hats, canes and chairs. His trademark use of hats was influenced by his own self-consciousness, according to Martin Gottfried in his biography of Fosse, "His baldness was the reason that he wore hats, and was doubtless why he put hats on his dancers." Fosse used gloves in his performances because he did not like his hands. Some of his most popular numbers include "Steam Heat" (The Pajama Game) and "Big Spender" (Sweet Charity). The "Rich Man's Frug" scene (starring a young Ben Vereen) in Sweet Charity is another example of his signature style.

For Damn Yankees, Fosse was inspired by the "father of theatrical jazz dance", Jack Cole. In 1957, Verdon and Fosse studied with Sanford Meisner to develop a better acting technique. According to Michael Joosten, Fosse once said: "The time to sing is when your emotional level is too high to just speak anymore, and the time to dance is when your emotions are just too strong to only sing about how you 'feel.'" In Redhead, Fosse used one of the first ballet sequences in a show that contained five different styles of dance: Fosse's jazz, a cancan, a gypsy dance, a march and an old-fashioned English music hall number. During Pippin, Fosse made the first television commercial for a Broadway show.

Personal life 
Fosse married dance partner Mary Ann Niles (1923–1987) on May 3, 1947, in Detroit. In 1952, a year after he divorced Niles, he married dancer Joan McCracken in New York City; this marriage lasted until 1959, when it also ended in divorce.

His third wife was dancer and actress Gwen Verdon, whom he met choreographing Damn Yankees, in which she starred. In 1963, they had a daughter, Nicole Fosse, who later became a dancer and actress. Fosse's extramarital affairs put a strain on the marriage and by 1971 they were separated, although they remained legally married until his death in 1987. Verdon never remarried.

Fosse met dancer Ann Reinking during the run of Pippin in 1972. According to Reinking, their romantic relationship ended "toward the end of the run of Dancin" (1978).

In 1961, Fosse's epilepsy was revealed when he had a seizure onstage during rehearsals for The Conquering Hero.

Fosse's time outside of the rehearsal studio or theater was seldom spent alone. As stated in the biography Fosse by Sam Wasson, "nights alone were murder on Fosse". To alleviate loneliness and insomnia brought on by his prescribed amphetamines, Fosse would often contact dancers he would work with and try to date them, making it hard for many to refuse his advances, but also giving him the affirmation of success he sought.

During their joint career, Fosse would continually take blame from critics while Gwen Verdon would get praise, no matter how much influence Verdon had on a production. However, Verdon always looked out for him and the Fosse family image, hosting grandiose cast parties and being Fosse's personal press secretary throughout their marriage.

Death 
Fosse died of a heart attack on September 23, 1987, at George Washington University Hospital while the revival of Sweet Charity was opening at the nearby National Theatre. He had collapsed in Verdon's arms near the Willard Hotel.

As he had requested, Verdon and Nicole Fosse scattered his ashes in the Atlantic Ocean off Quogue, Long Island, where Fosse had been living with his girlfriend of four years.

A month after his death, Verdon fulfilled Fosse's request for his friends to "go out and have dinner on me" by hosting a star-studded, celebrity filled evening at Tavern on the Green.

Work

Theatre

Film

Television

Awards and legacy 

At the 1973 Academy Awards, Fosse won the Academy Award for Best Director for Cabaret. That same year he won Tony Awards for directing and choreographing Pippin and Primetime Emmy Awards for producing, choreographing and directing Liza Minnelli's television special Liza with a Z. Fosse was the only person to win all three major industry awards in the same year.

Fosse was inducted into the National Museum of Dance in Saratoga Springs, New York on April 27, 2007. The Los Angeles Dance Awards, founded in 1994, were called the "Fosse Awards", and are now called the American Choreography Awards. The Bob Fosse-Gwen Verdon Fellowship was established by their daughter, Nicole Fosse, in 2003 at the Alvin Ailey American Dance Theater.

Reinking and Verdon kept Fosse's unique choreography alive after his death. Reinking played the role of Roxie Hart in the New York revival of Chicago, which opened in 1996. She choreographed the dances in Fosse style for that revival. In 1999, Verdon served as artistic consultant on a Broadway musical designed to showcase examples of classic Fosse choreography. Called simply Fosse, the three-act musical revue was conceived and directed by Richard Maltby, Jr. and Reinking, and choreographed by Reinking and Chet Walker. Verdon and Fosse's daughter, Nicole, received a special thanks credit. The show won a Tony for best musical.

Fosse/Verdon is an eight-part American miniseries starring Sam Rockwell as Fosse and Michelle Williams as Verdon. The series, which tells the story of the couple's troubled personal and professional relationship, is based on the biography Fosse by Sam Wasson. It premiered in eight parts on April 9, 2019, on FX. At the 71st Primetime Emmy Awards, Fosse/Verdon received seventeen nominations, including Outstanding Limited Series and acting nominations for Rockwell, Williams, and Qualley. Williams won the Emmy for Outstanding Actress in a Limited Series.

See also
 List of dancers

References

Further reading

External links 

 
 
 Archival footage of Ann Reinking and Gary Chryst performing in Bob Fosses's Big Noise from Winnetka in 1987 at Jacob's Pillow Dance Festival.

1927 births
1987 deaths
20th-century American male actors
20th-century American male writers
20th-century American screenwriters
American choreographers
American jazz dancers
American male dancers
American male film actors
American male musical theatre actors
American male screenwriters
American people of Irish descent
American people of Norwegian descent
Best Directing Academy Award winners
Best Director BAFTA Award winners
David di Donatello winners
Deaths from coronary thrombosis
Directors of Palme d'Or winners
Drama Desk Award winners
Film choreographers
Film directors from Illinois
Film directors from New York (state)
Male actors from Chicago
Metro-Goldwyn-Mayer contract players
People from Quogue, New York
Primetime Emmy Award winners
Screenwriters from Illinois
Screenwriters from New York (state)
Tony Award winners
United States Navy personnel of World War II
Writers from Chicago